Pedro Joaquín Galván (born 18 August 1985) is an Argentine professional footballer who plays as an attacking midfielder.

Career
Galván started his career in 2003 with Club de Gimnasia y Esgrima La Plata. In 2005, he joined San Martín de San Juan. He spent 2007 in Ecuador playing for Olmedo before returning to San Martín.

After San Martín were relegated from the Argentine Primera Galván joined Bnei Yehuda.
At the end of the 2012–13 season, Galván joined Maccabi Petah Tikva. On 22 February 2014, he scored his 71st goal in the Israeli Premier League, becoming the league's best scoring foreign player in history, beating former Maccabi Haifa star Đovani Roso.

In the summer of 2014, Galván left Israel for French Ligue 2 side Nîmes. In the end he had to return to play in Israel and signed for Bnei Yehuda and played there for two seasons. When Borak Obramov became the owner of the team, Galv'an said that he is going to leave the club on summer.

Career statistics

Honours
Bnei Yehud
Israel State Cup: 2016–17

References

External links
 
 Pedro Joaquín Galván – Argentine Primera statistics at Fútbol XXI 

1985 births
Living people
Sportspeople from Buenos Aires Province
Argentine footballers
Association football midfielders
Argentine Primera División players
Ecuadorian Serie A players
Club de Gimnasia y Esgrima La Plata footballers
San Martín de San Juan footballers
C.D. Olmedo footballers
Bnei Yehuda Tel Aviv F.C. players
Maccabi Petah Tikva F.C. players
Hapoel Ashkelon F.C. players
Hapoel Tel Aviv F.C. players
Hapoel Marmorek F.C. players
Hapoel Rishon LeZion F.C. players
Olimpo footballers
Israeli Premier League players
Liga Leumit players
Argentine expatriate footballers
Argentine expatriate sportspeople in Ecuador
Argentine expatriate sportspeople in Israel
Expatriate footballers in Ecuador
Expatriate footballers in Israel